Música en espera (Music on hold) is an Argentine romantic comedy film starring Natalia Oreiro and Diego Peretti. It premiered on March 19, 2009, and was the most seen movie in its starting week.

Plot
The story starts with composer Ezequiel having only a few days left to prepare the score of a movie in production. He calls his bank, to request a delay in his debt payment and is transferred from one office to another. When he is transferred to employee Paula's office he finds the inspiration he needs to finish his score in her hold music. However, he only hears it briefly.

Paula is 9-months pregnant and was left by her boyfriend Santiago early in her pregnancy. Her mother, deceived by Paula into thinking that she is still with her boyfriend, arrives from Spain in order to meet him and be present at the birth.

Ezequiel meets Paula at the bank. After they talk about his debt he requests to hear her hold music, but finds a different song playing as the songs are randomly assigned each day. He and Paula make a deal: he will pretend to be Santiago in front of Paula's mother while she helps him to locate the music. After many failed attempts he never does find the inspiring hold music, but instead finds inspiration during Paula's birth. He successfully composes the soundtrack. Ezequiel and Paula finally become a couple.

Cast 
 Diego Peretti as Ezequiel Font
 Natalia Oreiro as Paula Otero
 Norma Aleandro as Juana
 Carlos Bermejo as Isidoro Goldberg
 Rafael Spregelburd as Acosta
 Pilar Gamboa as Viviana
 Atilio Pozzobón as Taxi driver
 María Ucedo as Mariana
 Elvira Villariño as Mirta
 Rafael Ferro as Nicolás
 Luz Cipriota as Woman in film

References

2000s Spanish-language films
Argentine romantic comedy films
2009 romantic comedy films
2000s pregnancy films
2009 films
Films shot in Buenos Aires
Argentine pregnancy films
2000s Argentine films